Beth Shalom Reform Synagogue is a synagogue in the City of Cambridge. Founded in 1981, it held services in hired premises until 2015 when the community opened a new synagogue on a site on Auckland Road,  the first Reform synagogue in Cambridge. The new building includes a prayer hall for at least 200 people. The building was dedicated on 6 September 2015 at a service led by Fiona Karet Frankl and addressed by Rabbi Laura Janner-Klausner, senior rabbi to the Movement for Reform Judaism.

Affiliation and staff 

Beth Shalom Reform Synagogue is a member of the Movement for Reform Judaism. Most tasks at Beth Shalom are done by volunteers and, with the exception of visiting rabbis, all services are led by members of the community.

Services 

Services are held  weekly on Shabbat morning, High Holy Days and festivals. From time to time, a special 'Cheder Service' gives the Cheder (religion school) children and their families the opportunity to participate even more actively in the service and singing. Shabbat morning services are followed by a 'bring and share' Kiddush or sometimes a Kiddush sponsored by a member in honour of a special event.

On the high holydays, morning services are held for both days of Rosh Hashanah and Kol Nidrei and all day services on Yom Kippur, followed by havdalah and a communal breaking of the fast.

On all the other major Jewish festivals, including Sukkot and Simchat Torah, there are first-day morning services and for Sukkot there is a communal Sukkah. On Hanukkah there is a party, a tree-planting ceremony at Tu Bishvat, an evening Megillah reading at Purim and a special service for Yom Ha'Shoah. At Pesach a communal second-night Seder and a seventh day service are held.

Community 

Beth Shalom currently has over 400 adult and child members, comprising about 200 families.

Membership is open to all residents and students living in and around Cambridge who are Jewish by matrilineal descent or who have undergone conversion by a recognised beth din. Children, aged under 21, of members are automatically granted membership.

A number of members have non-Jewish partners who, although not eligible for membership, are made very welcome and encouraged to attend services and join in community activities.

Education 

Beth Shalom has a large cheder (religion school), adult education classes and a toddler group on Sunday mornings and there are regular social events such as an Oneg Shabbat and quiz, talks and cultural trips.

Hebrew classes for adult learners are held on Sunday mornings and occasional talks related to Jewish cultural heritage are held throughout the year.

Young people 

The community has made funding available for members of its B'nei Mitzvah class to attend Shemesh, the summer camps organised by RSY-Netzer, the Zionist youth movement for Reform Judaism. Young people are also encouraged to participate in Jewish holiday camps and in Europe tours and gap year schemes organised with Israel Experience. They also have the opportunity to join in local youth activities with Maccabi and JLGB, among others, and with RSY-Netzer.

Beth Shalom has its own Youth Group, aimed at young people from age 12 upwards and run in conjunction with RSY Netzer, the Reform youth movement.

After receiving a full Jewish education in preparation, the children of Beth Shalom members are provided with the opportunity to become Bar or Bat Mitzvah at the age of thirteen as part of the Shabbat morning service.

Most young people learn to chant a portion of the Torah, reading directly from the Torah scroll on the occasion of their Bar or Bat Mitzvah.

Wider community involvement 

Beth Shalom engages in social action projects in the wider community including raising money for Haiti and participation in Mitzvah Day and Human Rights Shabbat programmes.

See also
 List of Jewish communities in the United Kingdom

References

External links 
 Beth Shalom Synagogue website
 RSY-Netzer
 Beth Shalom Reform Synagogue on Jewish Communities and Records - UK (hosted by jewishgen.org).

1981 establishments in England
Buildings and structures in Cambridge
Jewish organizations established in 1981
Reform synagogues in the United Kingdom
Religion in Cambridge
Synagogues completed in 2015
Synagogues in England